Michel Giraud (14 July 1929 – 27 October 2011) was a French politician. He was notably Minister of Labor, deputy of Val-de-Marne, President of the Regional council of Île-de-France and president of the Mayors' Association of France.

References

1929 births
2011 deaths
People from Pontoise
Government ministers of France
Presidents of the Regional Council of Île-de-France
Members of the Regional Council of Île-de-France
Rally for the Republic politicians
Mayors of places in Île-de-France